The sixth generation of the Ford Taurus is the final generation of the model range manufactured by Ford (in markets outside of China and the Middle East).  Introduced for the 2010 model year, the sixth-generation Taurus is the second generation of the model line produced as a full-size car; it was the heaviest sedan sold under the Ford brand worldwide.  While sharing its D3 chassis underpinnings with the previous generation, the sixth generation marked the first North American use of Kinetic Design design language.

Coinciding with the withdrawal of the Mercury brand, the sixth-generation Taurus was developed without a Mercury Sable counterpart (for the first time).  From 2009 to 2017, Lincoln marketed a counterpart of the Taurus as the Lincoln MKS (functionally replacing the Lincoln Town Car).  While Ford has never officially announced it as a replacement for the Crown Victoria (or the Mercury Grand Marquis), the sixth generation Taurus was marketed in the full-size segment against many similar vehicles as the preceding sedans.

The sixth-generation Taurus marked the return of the Taurus SHO (for the first time since 1999) and the introduction of the Police Interceptor Sedan (replacing the Crown Victoria Police Interceptor).

As Ford expanded its model line of SUVs and crossover, the Taurus sedan was discontinued following the 2019 model year. On March 1, 2019, the final Taurus built in the United States rolled off the Chicago assembly line, ending 34 years of the nameplate in North America (since the 2016 model year, Changan Ford has produced a namesake model as its flagship sedan specifically designed for China and exported to the Middle East following the discontinuation of the North American Taurus).

The model line was assembled at the Chicago Assembly in Illinois alongside the Ford Explorer and the Lincoln MKS.

Development and marketing

In late 2006, Ford Motor Company named Boeing CEO Alan Mulally to replace William Clay Ford Jr. as its own chief executive.  One of his first decisions was to abandon the unpopular "F" model naming scheme for Ford-division cars.  A critic of the decision to end the usage of the Ford Taurus/Mercury Sable nameplates, Mullaly redesignated the 2008 model year update of the Ford Five Hundred and Mercury Montego as the fifth-generation Ford Taurus and Mercury Sable before its release to the public; the Ford Freestyle became the Ford Taurus X.

Although the change back to the Taurus addressed several major deficiencies of the Five Hundred (largely related to the powertrain), the vehicle itself still drew criticism for bland styling derived from its predecessor (one reviewer describing it as a "SUV shaped like a sedan") and handling rated behind its competitors.  Although the Taurus gained 60 hp over the Five Hundred, most of its deficiences were related to its introduction essentially being a mid-cycle refresh of its predecessor under a new nameplate.

In January 2008, Alan Mulally revealed that a sixth generation of the Ford Taurus was in development as a planned 2010 model, calling it  "the one we should have built originally".   In April 2008, a photograph of a full-scale prototype mockup of the 2010 Ford Taurus was leaked onto the Internet.  After the styling of the prototype was seen worldwide, Ford contemplated legal action against web sites which posted the photo and Ford attorneys asked site owners to remove the photo.

Towards its launch, the Ford Motor Company website introduced several videos, benchmarking the 2010 Ford Taurus against several production luxury sedans. One test video displayed that the paint coat of the Taurus was more resistant to gravel chips than a Lexus LS460 while another displayed the blind-spot detection sensor system unavailable on an Infiniti M45x.  The 2010 Ford Taurus SHO was faster than an Audi A6 4.2 FSI Quattro in straight-line acceleration while the interior of the Ford Taurus was quieter than an Acura RL.

In a major contrast from previous generations of the Ford Taurus, once the highest-selling nameplate in the United States, Ford deliberately aimed for lower sales volumes.  Instead of the 1990s peak volumes of nearly 400,000 vehicles a year, the intended sales were closer to 50,000 to 75,000.  As a full-size car, the Taurus competed closer to the Toyota Avalon and Nissan Maxima than the Toyota Camry, Honda Accord, and Nissan Altima (competitors of the Ford Fusion).  Additionally, Ford sought to preserve the resale value of the Taurus by avoiding the usage of fleet sales of the vehicles (though the Taurus would replace the Crown Victoria as the Ford Police Interceptor sedan).

Release 
The 2010 Ford Taurus was unveiled at the 2009 North American International Auto Show at Cobo Hall. In May 2009, the new Taurus debuted at three dealers in the Buffalo, Tampa, and Houston, respectively, to be put on display and to build anticipation for the release. The first dealer, West Herr Ford in Hamburg, New York, was chosen due to the successful unveiling of the redesigned Ford F-150 earlier that year.

The 2009 Taurus's counterparts, the Ford Taurus X and the Mercury Sable, ceased production in spring 2009 at Ford's Chicago Assembly Plant. The sixth-generation Taurus' production started on June 15, 2009, for the 2010 model year. Unlike previous generations of the Taurus, the sixth-generation Taurus would not have a Sable counterpart since the Mercury brand was in the process of being phased out by the end of 2010.  For the first time since 2002, Lincoln dealers sold a Taurus-based sedan, the Lincoln MKS, introduced as a 2009 model.

Design overview

Chassis
The sixth-generation Ford Taurus is based on the Volvo-derived Ford D3 platform architecture, sharing the 112.9-inch wheelbase of the Lincoln MKS and the previous Ford Taurus (Five Hundred).  As with its predecessor, the Ford Taurus features a front-wheel drive powertrain as standard with the option of an all-wheel drive configuration (standard on the SHO).

As with all other D3 sedans, the Ford Taurus is configured with four-wheel independent suspension, featuring MacPherson struts and rearward-facing lower L-arms with a stabilizer bar in the front and a multilink coilover shock setup with stamped steel lower control arms and cast upper control arms in the rear.   As with the previous-generation Taurus (Five Hundred) and the Ford Crown Victoria, the sixth-generation Taurus features four-wheel antilock disc brakes.  On all models, AdvanceTrac combines traction control and stability control.  Torque Vectoring Control and Curve Control is an option for all-wheel drive models.

A number of safety systems seen in this generation of the Taurus either saw their debut or one of their first uses by Ford in the vehicle, including BLIS, Adaptive cruise control, Forward Collision Warning with Brake Support, and Lane keeping assist.  As with its predecessor, the Ford Taurus is equipped with dual front airbags, side airbags, and curtain airbags.

Although previewed by the V8-powered Ford Interceptor and is a full-size sedan like the Ford Crown Victoria, the sixth-generation Ford Taurus is not available with a V8 engine.  At its 2010 launch, the standard engine was the 263 hp 3.5L V6 retained from the previous Taurus, which was upgraded to 288 hp in 2013.  The Taurus SHO is powered by a 365 hp twin-turbocharged version of this engine (EcoBoost V6) shared with the Lincoln MKS and MKT.  In 2013, a 3.7L 305 hp non-turbocharged V6 became the available for the Police Interceptor Sedan and was unavailable on the standard Taurus. In 2014, a 2.0L turbocharged 240 hp 4-cylinder (EcoBoost 2.0) became optional on the SEL and Limited models, becoming the first 4-cylinder Taurus since 1991 (also the smallest engine ever fitted in a Taurus). The 2.0L EcoBoost engine was dropped after the 2017 model year. All versions of the Taurus use variations of the Ford 6-speed 6F automatic transmission.

Body

The design of the sixth-generation Ford Taurus was led by Chief Designer Earl Lucas. Many of the Taurus' design elements were influenced by the music that the design team listened to. According to Earl Lucas, "When you've got good music, it's amazing how many shapes come out".  The 2007 Ford Interceptor concept would also lend design influence to the grille, rear fascia and taillamps, as well as the roofline.

The sixth-generation Ford Taurus introduced many interior features not seen in its predecessor (or the outgoing Ford Crown Victoria/Mercury Grand Marquis), including: Ford Sync, push-button start, heated front and rear seats. Multi-Contour Seats, a first in Ford vehicles when introduced in 2010, feature air cushions that pad the driver and passenger's entire back (three for lumbar support, four for lateral support and four for the seat pad). The bottom cushion features Active Motion technology, which provides a subtle continuous massage, designed to lessen back pain on long trips.

In 2013, the Ford Taurus saw a mid-cycle refresh, adopting features of the global Kinetic Design language featured on redesigns of the Ford Focus, Ford Fiesta, and Ford Kuga.  While the roofline and side panels stayed the same, the Taurus was given a new front fascia with a trapezoidal upper grille (emphasized on the SHO and Police Interceptor) and restyled headlamps.  In the rear, LED taillamps made their return (for the first time since the 2007 Mercury Montego) along with dual exhaust (true dual exhaust on the SHO/EcoBoost V6; split exhaust outlets on all other versions).  While the interior saw fewer changes in terms of styling, a number of changes were made with its content.  For 2013, Ford redesigned the steering wheel, instrument cluster, center stack, and shifter. A new interactive instrument cluster, the MyFord Touch system (which includes a new head unit with 8-inch touch screen), and heated steering wheel were optional. Other features new to the 2013 Taurus include an all new Sony sound system featuring HD Radio and iTunes Tagging, Multicontour seats with Active Motion (massage), push-button start, auto high beams, and a rear view camera. Structural improvements were also made in order to better protect drivers in small-overlap frontal crashes.  For 2013, the Taurus replaced the Crown Victoria/Grand Marquis as the full-size Ford offering in the Middle East, becoming offered in that region for the first time.

For 2014, new wheel designs were introduced, with minor changes to standard and optional equipment. A Lane keeping assist feature was added to the Driver Assist package.

In 2017, MyFordTouch was replaced by the new Sync 3 system. 2016 models could be upgraded to Sync 3 via software update. This was the final update to the Taurus.

Variants and trim levels

The sixth generation Ford Taurus was sold to the public in four trim levels, base SE, mid-trim SEL, luxury Limited, and the performance-trim SHO. From 2013 to 2019, there was also a fleet-sales only Police Interceptor Sedan.

The base SE model, designed for rental and fleet use, came stock with a 3.5 L 24-valve DOHC Duratec V6 engine, six-speed automatic transmission, manual tilt/telescopic steering wheel with audio and cruise control functions, an AM/FM stereo with a single CD player, clock, MP3 capability, and six speakers, Ford's MyKey system, and AdvanceTrac electronic stability control. All wheel drive was not available on the base SE trim.

The mid-range SEL trim level had the same engine, with a six-speed SelectShift automatic transmission featuring paddle activation, optional all wheel drive, dual-zone electronic automatic temperature control, a leather-wrapped steering wheel and shift knob, Sirius satellite radio, and a perimeter anti-theft alarm.

The top-of-the-line Limited model featured perforated heated and cooled leather-trim bucket seats, ambient lighting with choices of seven different colors, SYNC voice-activated communication and entertainment system, a premium AM/FM radio with a six-disc in-dash CD changer, chrome-accenting, heated mirrors with memory and security approach lamps, a reverse sensing system and rear view camera.

Taurus SHO

The 2010 Taurus SHO was unveiled at the 2009 Chicago Auto Show.  It went on sale in summer 2009, with a base MSRP of $37,995 (including destination fees).

The SHO Performance Package includes upgraded brake pads, recalibrated electronic power-assisted steering for improved responsiveness, a "Sport Mode" setting for the Electronic Stability Control, ability to turn off the AdvanceTrac stability control system, 27mm front anti-roll bar instead of the standard 29mm front anti-roll bar for more neutral turn-in, vented front brake dust shields from the Police Interceptor, cooling package from the Police Interceptor (engine oil, transmission oil, and power transfer unit), a shorter 3.16 to 1 final drive ratio for faster acceleration, and summer-compound 20" Goodyear Eagle F1 performance tires with premium painted wheels.  time is rated at 5.2 seconds.

Ford Police Interceptor Sedan

When the Ford Crown Victoria Police Interceptor (CVPI) ended production in late 2011, Ford developed two new models to replace it, as part of their Ford Police Interceptor range. For the 2013 model year, Ford introduced the Taurus-based Ford Police Interceptor Sedan (FPIS) and Explorer-based Ford Police Interceptor Utility (FPIU). Co-developed and tested by the Los Angeles County Sheriff's Department and the Michigan State Police, the FPIS was a specially-designed variant of the sixth-generation Taurus. 

Unlike the outgoing CVPI, the sedan was unavailable with a V8 engine or rear-wheel drive. The EcoBoost version of the FPIS had several features that were shared with the Taurus SHO Performance Package and not available with the other engine choices such as its SHO Performance Package-calibrated electronic power steering system, and 3.16 final drive ratio. Shortly after the FPIS's release, a naturally aspirated 3.7 L engine taken from the Ford Mustang (in transverse arrangement) was added to the lineup, replacing the naturally aspirated 3.5 L V6 as the standard engine. However, the naturally aspirated 3.5 L remained available as a cost-saving option. The new 3.7 L V6 was not available on the civilian Ford Taurus. Its  aluminum block V6 engine weighed  less than the previous version. All available engines came standard with a six-speed automatic transmission, and all-wheel drive. Front-wheel drive was an available cost-saving option for the naturally aspirated 3.5 L V6 version. The naturally aspirated 3.5L and 3.7L V6 engines came standard with Ford's Twin Independent Variable Camshaft Timing (Ti-VCT) system. Flex Fuel was an available option for both the naturally aspirated 3.5 L and 3.7 L engines, enabling them to run on E85 fuel. 

Ford stated that the FPIS would match the safety record of the outgoing CVPI. The FPIS was available with a host of safety technologies not available on the CVPI, such as Blind Spot Information System, a rear-view camera, Ford SYNC, a reverse sensing system, automatic headlights, electronic stability control, and side-curtain airbags. The FPIS was designed and built alongside the FPIU; to facilitate easier repairs and user familiarity, many parts, repair techniques, specifications, and vehicle interfaces were intentionally the same.

The entire FPIS line was equipped with a long list of standard features tailored to law-enforcement and severe-duty use, such as  rear-impact protection; a police calibrated ECM for high performance driving and long idling; a heavy-duty cooling system that included an enlarged radiator, an engine oil cooler, transmission cooler, power transfer unit (PTU) cooler, and police-calibrated radiator fan settings; a 220-ampere alternator; heavy-duty  brake rotors with special ventilation and  five-spoke steel wheels; a police-tuned suspension with upsized sway bars and premium wheel hubs; steel deflector plates along the underbody; reinforced frame points; reinforced front door hinges with large tethers, and a specially tuned electronic stability control system set up for emergency-style driving. The interior offered heavy-duty front and rear cloth seats or rear vinyl seats, stab-proof front seat-backs, vinyl or carpeted flooring, a column shifter as opposed to a floor shifter, washable rear door panels, programmable steering wheel buttons, the ability to disable the rear door handles and switches from the factory, specialized areas to mount emergency equipment, and a certified-calibration speedometer ( for the standard 3.5 L,  for the EcoBoost and 3.7 L versions).  For the duration of the FPIS's production, Ford partnered with emergency vehicle equipment manufacturer Whelen Engineering Company to offer preinstalled emergency equipment.  Each purchasing police agency could choose from a variety of options when ordering the vehicle. Options included premade wire harnesses, lighting packages, and siren controllers. Ford marketed this customizable package as the 'Ready for the Road' option.

Like the outgoing CVPI, Ford offered hubcaps, additional colors, and the option to delete the model badge in order to give the vehicle a more civilian-like appearance for unmarked use. Ford offered a Taurus-based "Special Service Sedan" with some of the same features as the Police Interceptor Sedan; however, it used a 2.0 L EcoBoost four-cylinder and was designed only for detective and administrative uses. The Special Service Sedan was equipped with heavy-duty suspension, braking, and cooling components like its Interceptor counterpart. It came standard with active grille shutters, and was available only with front wheel drive. Despite being designed solely for detective and administrative uses, it became pursuit rated in 2015. The Special Service Sedan was dropped after the 2017 model year.

As Ford considered in 2015 whether to continue producing the Taurus in the United States, one reason to do so was the FPIS, though the Police Interceptor Utility was more popular and sales of the police sedan were down. In March 2019, the Taurus-based FPIS was discontinued along with the rest of the Taurus line. It was succeeded by the second generation Explorer-based Police Interceptor Utility. Its intended replacement, the Fusion-based Police Responder Hybrid Sedan, was discontinued after the 2020 model year.

Ford Police Interceptor Sedan Performance Specs (based on Michigan State Police testing):

Reception 
The Ford scored well in test drives, and the media was pleased with some of the new features available in the 2010 Ford Taurus. Some of these features include all wheel drive, cross traffic alert, collision warning, blind spot monitoring and adaptive cruise control. The Taurus shares the powertrain and many available technological options of the Lincoln MKS, which is built on the same platform and mechanical underpinnings, while having a starting MSRP of US$10,000 less than the MKS.

While its predecessor was criticized for dull styling, the new Taurus was described as "big and muscular" to draw attention, albeit "a love-it-or-hate-it affair". Motor Trend stated that "its broad stance, high sill line, slit headlamps, and technical grille give it a leopard look" which was considered handsome.

However, despite being praised for its exterior appearance, it was still criticized for its lack of interior room and reduced sight-lines despite its full-sized exterior dimensions, compared to the previous-generation Five Hundred/Taurus which was praised for its vast interior and greenhouse visibility; one reviewer remarked that while the "old Taurus' interior was cavernous; the new one just feels like a cavern". Edmunds noted that the eighth-generation Honda Accord (which competes in the mid-size category) had superior driving dynamics and a more efficient design that yielded almost as much interior space as the larger Taurus. Car and Driver described the Taurus as overweight and underpowered, with unresponsive braking and steering, while Motor Trend criticized a few aspects of the interior as evidently cost-cutting.

Water pump issues 
Water pumps on 2008 to 2019 Ford Taurus and 2013 to 2019 Ford Police Interceptor Sedan equipped with the 3.5L Ford Cyclone V6 V6, 3.5L EcoBoost V6, and 3.7L V6 have a tendency to fail and potentially ruin the engine. The water pumps on these engines are internally mounted and driven by the timing chain. As a result, when they fail, antifreeze is dumped directly into the crankcase; mixing with engine oil and potentially damaging the head gaskets and connecting rod bearings. Many of these water pump failures occur without warning and repairs often cost thousands of dollars as the engine needs to be disassembled or removed from the vehicle to access the water pump. In some cases, the engine will need to be replaced outright. A class action lawsuit was started against Ford as a result of this issue.

Safety
2010 National Highway Traffic Safety Administration (NHTSA) crash test ratings:

 Frontal driver: 
 Frontal passenger: 
 Front side: 
 Rear side: 
 Rollover:

Discontinuation in North America
On April 25, 2018, Ford announced plans to discontinue the Taurus (along with the Fiesta, Focus, and Fusion), in order to focus more on its line of trucks and SUVs. The announcement was part of a plan by Ford Motor Company to cut costs and increase profits. This was in response to a shift in perceived consumer demand towards SUVs and pickup trucks, and away from sedans. On September 5, 2018, Ford ended all national and promotional advertising (including sales and special offers) for its entire sedan lineup, including the Taurus. On March 1, 2019, the last U.S. Ford Taurus, a white Limited model, rolled off of the assembly line at the Ford Chicago plant.

See also

 Carbon E7
 Chevrolet Caprice 9C1
 Dodge Charger Pursuit

References and notes

External links
 Official Ford Taurus Site
 Official Ford Taurus Police Interceptor Site
 
 Ford Product Press Info

6th generation
2010s cars
All-wheel-drive vehicles
Executive cars
Ford D3 platform
Front-wheel-drive vehicles
Full-size vehicles
Police vehicles
Sedans
Cars introduced in 2009
Flagship vehicles